Aprendiendo a vivir (English title: Learning to live) is a Mexican telenovela produced by Humberto Navarro and directed by Rafael Banquells for Televisa in 1984. It starred Julio Alemán, Sonia Furió, Miguel Gómez Checa, Octavio Galindo and Tina Romero.

Cast 
Julio Alemán as Rafael
Sonia Furió as Gloria
Miguel Gómez Checa as Pepe
Octavio Galindo as Raul
Tina Romero as Silvia
Rosa Furman as Leonor
Dina de Marco as Perla
Silvia Mariscal as Martha
Héctor Sáez as Guillermo
Guillermo Orea as Don Jose
Luz María Aguilar as Amada
Carlos Monden as Juan Manuel
Lilia Michel as Carolina
Estela Chacón as Fedora
Carmen Cortés as Nachita
Antonio Ruiz as Alfredo
Óscar Bonfiglio as Juan Manuel
Carmen Delgado as Raquel
Lorena Rivero as Olga
Rafael Baledón
Héctor Gómez as Guillermo
Daniel Martin as Pepe

References

External links

1984 telenovelas
Mexican telenovelas
1984 Mexican television series debuts
1984 Mexican television series endings
Spanish-language telenovelas
Television shows set in Mexico City
Televisa telenovelas